Judith Furse (4 March 1912 – 29 August 1974) was an English actress.

Career
A member of the Furse family, her father was Lieutenant-General Sir William Furse and mother 
Jean Adelaide Furse. Her brother, Roger, became a stage designer and painter who also worked in films.

She was educated at St Paul's Girls' School and studied theatre at the Old Vic in the early 1930s. By the end of that decade, she became a stage actress. One of Judith Furse's earliest film roles was as Sister Briony in Black Narcissus (1947). She was known for her heavy-set, somewhat masculine looks, and was often cast as overbearing types such as the villainous Doctor Crow in Carry On Spying (1964). Other films included The Man in the White Suit (1951), Mother Riley Meets the Vampire (1952), Blue Murder at St Trinian's (1957), Carry On Regardless (1961), Live Now, Pay Later (1962) and Carry On Cabby (1963). One of her more sympathetic roles was as Flora, Greer Garson's concerned travelling companion, in the original Goodbye, Mr Chips (1939). She made her last film appearance, as a drag king, in the Australian film The Adventures of Barry McKenzie (1972).

In 1958, she, Roger Livesey, Terry-Thomas, Rita Webb, Avril Angers, and Miles Malleson, recorded 'Indian Summer of an Uncle', and 'Jeeves Takes Charge'  for the Caedmon Audio record label, (Caedmon Audio TC-1137). She played Aunt Agatha. It was released in stereo in 1964.

Partial filmography

 Goodbye, Mr Chips (1939) – Flora
 A Canterbury Tale (1944) – Dorothy Bird
 English Without Tears (1944) – Elise Batter-Jones
 Johnny Frenchman (1945) – Jane Matthews
 Quiet Weekend (1946) – Ella Spender
 While the Sun Shines (1947) – Female Receptionist
 Black Narcissus (1947) – Sister Briony
 One Night with You (1948) – Second Writer
 Bond Street (1948) – Miss Lane (uncredited)
 It's Hard to Be Good (1948) – Sister Taylor (uncredited)
 Marry Me! (1949) – Statuesque Woman (uncredited)
 Helter Skelter (1949) – Mrs. Martin
 Dear Mr. Prohack (1949) – Laura Postern
 The Romantic Age (1949) – Miss Adams
 The Browning Version (1951) – Mrs. Williamson
 The Man in the White Suit (1951) – Nurse Gamage
 I Believe in You (1952) – Policewoman Jones (uncredited)
 Mother Riley Meets the Vampire (1952) – Freda
 The Heart of the Matter (1953) – Dr.Sykes (uncredited) 
 A Day to Remember (1953) – Lady in Charge of Party (uncredited)
 Mad About Men (1954) – Viola
 The Cockleshell Heroes (1955) – W.V.S. Woman
 Doctor at Large (1957) – Mrs. Digby – Innkeeper
 Blue Murder at St Trinian's (1957) – Dame Maud Hackshaw
 Further Up the Creek (1958) – Chief Wren
 Serious Charge (1959) – Probation Officer
 Scent of Mystery (1960) – Miss Leonard
 Sands of the Desert (1960) – Yasmin
 Not a Hope in Hell (1960) – Miss Appleton
 Carry On Regardless (1961) – Girl Guide Leader
 A Weekend with Lulu (1961) – Mme. Bon-Bon
 Postman's Knock (1962) – Station Mistress (uncredited)
 In the Doghouse (1962) – Massage Woman
 I Thank a Fool (1962) – Warden
 Live Now, Pay Later (1962) – Mrs. Ackroyd
 The Iron Maiden (1962) – Mrs. Webb
 Carry On Cabby (1963) – Battleaxe Rider
 A Jolly Bad Fellow (1964) – Lady Davidson
 Carry On Spying (1964) – Doctor Crow
 The Amorous Adventures of Moll Flanders (1965) – Miss Glowber
 Sky West and Crooked (1965) – Mrs. Rigby
 The Dirty Dozen (1967) – Drunken General's Wife (uncredited)
 Sinful Davey (1969) – Mary
 Twinky (1970) – School Miss-tress
 Man in the Wilderness (1971) – Nurse
 The Adventures of Barry McKenzie (1972) – Claude (final film role)

References

External links

 Brief Encounters: Lesbians and Gays in British Cinema, 1930–1971

English film actresses
English stage actresses
English television actresses
British lesbian actresses
People educated at St Paul's Girls' School
People from Camberley
People from Canterbury
1912 births
1974 deaths
Actresses from Kent
20th-century English actresses
20th-century English LGBT people